Mazeppa is a 1909 Russian drama film directed by Vasili Goncharov.

Plot 

The film tells about the Hetman named Mazepa, who is in love with Kochubey's daughter, Maria, and asks her father for consent to marry her, but his father refuses him. This does not stop them and they run away...

Cast 
 Vasili Stepanov as Kochubey
 Andrey Gromov as Mazepa
 Raisa Reyzen as Maria
 Antonina Pozharskaya as Maria's mother

References

External links 
 

1909 films
1900s Russian-language films
Russian drama films
Films based on works by Aleksandr Pushkin
Cultural depictions of Ivan Mazepa